Achillea aegyptiaca, the Egyptian yarrow, is an ornamental plant in the aster family native to Greece.

From John Wood's Hardy Perennials and Old Fashioned Flowers:
This is an evergreen (though herb-like) species. It has been grown for more than 200 years in English gardens, and originally came, as its name implies, from Egypt. Notwithstanding the much warmer climate of its native country, it proves to be one of the hardiest plants in our gardens. I dare say many will think the yarrows are not worthy of a place in the garden; but not only are fine and useful flowers included in this work, but also the good "old-fashioned" kinds, and that a few such are to be found amongst the yarrows is without doubt. Could the reader see the collection now before me, cut with a good piece of stem and some foliage, and pushed into a deep vase, he would not only own that they were a pleasing contrast, but quaintly grand for indoor decoration.

Achillea aegyptiaca not only produces a rich yellow flower, but the whole plant is ornamental, having an abundance of finely cut foliage, which, from a downy or nappy covering, has a pleasing grey or silvery appearance. The flowers are produced on long stems nearly 2 ft [] high, furnished at the nodes with clean grey tufts of smaller-sized leaves; near the top the stems are all but naked, and are terminated by the flat heads or corymbs of closely packed flowers. They are individually small, but the corymbs will be from 2 to 3 inches across []. Their form is that of the common yarrow, but the colour is a bright light yellow. The leaves are 6 to 8 inches long [], narrow and pinnate, the leaflets of irregular form, variously toothed and lobed; the whole foliage is soft to the touch, from the nappy covering, as already mentioned. Its flowers, from their extra fine colour, are very telling in a cut state. The plant is suitable for the borders, more especially amongst other old kinds. Ordinary garden loam suits it, and its propagation may be carried out at any time by root division. Flowering period, June to September.

References
This article incorporates text from the Hardy Perennials and Old Fashioned Flowers by John Wood, a publication now in the public domain.

aegyptiaca
Garden plants of Europe
Plants described in 1753
Taxa named by Carl Linnaeus